On Yixing Tea Pot (阳羡茗壶系 Yangxian Min Hu Xi) is a book about Yixing tea pot written by Ming dynasty author Zhou Gaochi ca. 1640. In this book, Zhou provided a detail account on the origin and history of Yixing tea pot, followed by an account of the great masters and their disciples.

Content
 Yixing Tea Pot Series
 Origin of Yixing Tea Pot
 Orthodox school
 Yixing Tea Pot Masters
 Famous Yixing Tea Pot Experts
 Elegant styles
 Magical Items
 Diverse Schools of Yixing Tea Pot makers

Chinese tea classic texts
1640 books
Teapots
Yixing